As of 2005, the Philippines was the ninth largest sugar producer in the world and second largest sugar producer among the Association of Southeast Asian Nations (ASEAN) countries, after Thailand, according to Food and Agriculture Organization. At least seventeen provinces of the Philippines have grown sugarcane, of which the two on Negros Island account for half of the nation's total production. As of crop year 2009-2010, 29 sugar mills are operational divided as follows: thirteen mills on Negros, six mills on Luzon, four mills on Panay, three mills in Eastern Visayas and three mills on Mindanao.

Sugarcane is not a sensitive crop and can be grown in almost all types of soil, from sandy to clay loams and from acidic volcanic soils to calcareous sedimentary deposits. The harvest period is from October to December and ends in May.

In 2015, the National Commission for Culture and the Arts of the Philippines announced that they will include the Industrial Sugar Central Sites of the Philippines and related properties to the UNESCO World Heritage List.

History

The history of the sugarcane cultivation in the Philippines pre-dates Spanish colonization. Sugarcane, specifically Saccharum sinense, is one of the original major crops of the Austronesian peoples (which includes Filipinos), since at least 3500 BCE. It reached the Philippines from Taiwan with the Austronesian Expansion by around 2200 BCE. Words for sugarcane are reconstructed as *təbuS or *CebuS in Proto-Austronesian, which became *tebuh in Proto-Malayo-Polynesian (cf. Filipino tubó). Saccharum officinarum was later acquired from early farming cultures in Papua New Guinea and gradually replaced S. sinense throughout its cultivated range in maritime Southeast Asia.

Sugarcane was traditionally used in the pre-colonial Philippines for making various native jaggery products (collectively called panutsa, like pakombuk, sangkaka and bagkat bao) used in cooking. It was also widely used to make traditional wines like palek, byais, basi, intus, and pangasi. Sugarcane juice is also fermented into traditional cane vinegars in the Philippines (variously called sukang basi, sukang maasim, or sukang iloko). Traditional cane vinegar are associated with sugarcane wine-making.

Sugarcane farming became an industry after 1856 when Nicholas Loney, a British Vice-Consul, was sent to Iloilo City and convinced the American house of Russell & Sturgis to open a branch in Iloilo for the purpose of giving crop loans to sugar planters. Loney through his firm, Loney and Kee Company, facilitated the fast development of sugar industry by importing sugar cuttings from Sumatra and machinery from England and Scotland to Iloilo, which the sugar planters can buy on easy installment loans.  Loney also built sailing boats called lorcha (boat)s, patterned after the Brixham trawlers used for deep-sea fishing in the English channel, at Buenavista on Guimaras Island to transport sugar from Negros Island. Envisioning the prosperity of a sugar industry in Visayas in the near future, Loney initiated its development in Negros and offered liberal terms to a few Negrense planters similar to those he had given the Ilonggo planters.  Consequently, some prominent Ilonggo sugarcane planters like the Ledesma, Lacson, Hilado, Cosculluela, Pérez, Alvarez, Sotamayor and Escanilla families moved to Negros in 1857 due to its promising development. The raw sugar which the Visayas’ main product was exported to the United States, England and Australia. Crystal grain sugar was the product of Manila which was exported primarily to Spain.

The Philippines main agricultural export commodity (late 1700s–1970s)

Sugar became the most important agricultural export of the Philippines between the late eighteenth century and the mid-1970s because of two main reasons: 1) foreign exchange earned and 2) it was the basis of wealth accumulation of some Filipino elite at that time. To ensure the continuous growth and development of sugar industry under the Philippine Commonwealth government, Philippine Sugar Administration (PSA) was established in 1937 to oversee the industry.

After the Second World War the Sugar Quota Administration (SQA) replaced PSA in 1951 vis-à-vis with Philippine Sugar Institute (PHILSUGIN), a research agency. During the 1950s and 1960s, more than 20 percent of Philippine exports came from the sugar industry. It declined in the 1970s and plunged further in the first half of the 1980s to roughly 7 percent. It was during this period that the government acknowledged the existence of crisis in the industry. One of the factors that contributed to the worsening situation of the industry during that time was the depressed market for sugar.

In 1974, there was a dramatic escalation in the world price that peaked at around US$0.67 per pound of sugar. In succeeding two consecutive years, world prices of sugar fell to less than US$0.10 and remain in that situation for few years until it moved upward before the decade ends. During the early 1980s, world sugar prices fell again, with US$0.03 per pound as the bottom. Prices recovered to US$0.14 per pound then fell again to between $0.08 to 0.09 per pound at the beginning of the early 1990s.

Free trade with the United States and the Quota System

The transfer of Philippines as a colony from the Spanish to the Americans was not easy due to strong resistance from Filipino leader Emilio Aguinaldo. Soon after the fall of Aguinaldo in Palanan, Isabela, the Philippines was completely under the American rule. The Americans, unlike their predecessors, provided partial liberty to the Filipinos by preparing the latter to achieve independence and run its own government through a Commonwealth form of state.

The initial resistance turned into market cooperation that emanated from trust and good will of Filipino people towards the American colonizers and vice versa. United States’ colonization of the Philippines protected the country from vicissitudes of world sugar prices due to its free access to a protected and subsidized American market, which started in 1913, when the United States established free trade with its Philippine colony.

The United States treated the Philippines like one of its American states that resulted to state protection of the Philippine sugar market. Twenty-one years later in 1934, the United States enacted a quota system on sugar that remained enforced until early 70s. In 1965, U.S. Sugar Act was amended to provide the following terms in Quota system:
 A basic quota of 1,050,000 short tons plus 10.86% of any U.S. consumption increase from 9.7 million to 10.4 million tons or a total basic quota of 1,126,000 short tons for the Philippines;
 47.22% of the deficits of U.S. domestic producers and other foreign country suppliers which conservatively is estimated to be about 200,000 tons, shall be allotted to the Philippines;
 The encouragement, if not a requirement that the Philippines maintain in reserve the equivalent of 15% of her U.S. quotas or roughly 180,000 tons;
 The premium recapture fee and a quarterly system of allocation during the first semester of each calendar year.

Despite restrictions on sugar trading, exports of Philippine sugar to the U.S. remained in a relatively privileged position especially during the 70s. Philippine quotas for the United States ranged between 25 and 30 percent, a rate that is higher than other sugar suppliers like the Dominican Republic, Mexico and Brazil.

Early decline
Philippines exported sugar on the world market, generally to unrestricted locations, after U.S. quota law on sugar reached its expiration in 1974. Consequently, sugar shipments to the United States declined during this period. A quota system for the sugar importation was renewed by the United States on May 5, 1982. However sugar allocations were based on a country’s share in sugar trade with the United States in 1975 to 1981, the periods when exports of Philippine sugar to United States decreased; during this period, allocations of Philippine sugar was only 13.5 percent about half compared to its allocations in the early 1970s.

Efforts to make allocations raised to 25 percent were failed. The imposition of new quota system for sugar compounded by remarkable drop of 40 percent in total American imports of sugar in the mid-1980s resulted to huge loss of sales to the Philippines. The negative effect was greatly felt in the island of Negros, where sugar industry is directly responsible for 25 percent of employment of local farm workers.

Government monopolization (1970s)

In the 70s, President Ferdinand Marcos and his economic advisers argued that pervasive market failures were the root cause of the decline of the sugar industry. In order to rescue the industry, central coordination was crucial. The Marcos Administration followed a diffusionist argument, calling for government to replace the market in order to stimulate the market development of the sugar industry 

In 1976, in response to precipitous declines in sugar prices, President Marcos issued Presidential Decree No. 3888 (and amended by Presidential Decree Nos. 775 and 1192), ordering the establishment of the Philippine Sugar Commission (PHILSUCOM). This commission assumed the functions of both SQA and PHILSUGIN, and was given the sole power to buy and sell sugar, set prices paid to planters and millers, and purchase companies connected to the sugar industry. In May 1978, the Republic Planters Bank was established to provide adequate and timely financing to the sugar industry.

To minimize the impact of fluctuating world sugar prices during this period, PHILSUCOM established a protective pricing policy, entering into four-year term contracts. These contracts assured that 50 percent of exported sugar would be sold at an average price of 23.5 U.S. Cents per pound, an amount lesser than the prevailing world rate of 30 U.S. Cents per pound. This was followed by the government's monopolization of the sugar industry.

Contrary to expectations, government substitution in the market did not improve the industry. PHILSUCOM and its trading subsidiary, the National Sugar Trading Corporation (NASUTRA), were tainted with controversies. According to the findings of a study conducted by a group of economists in the University of the Philippines (U.P.), sugar producers' losses reached an estimated value between 11 to 14 billion Philippine Pesos during the period between 1974 and 1983.

Establishment of Sugar Regulatory Administration (SRA)
After the 1986 Revolution, which ousted Marcos, President Corazon Aquino immediately appointed Fred J. Elizalde as Officer-in-Charge (OIC) of the institutions that will regulate the sugar industry since the administration that time was technically in revolutionary form of government. On May 28, 1986, Executive Order No. 18 established the current Sugar Regulatory Administration (SRA). The SRA was mandated to carry out the following functions: to institute an orderly system in sugarcane production for the stable, sufficient and balanced production of sugar; to establish and maintain a balanced relation between production and requirement of sugar, and marketing conditions as will stabilize prices; to promote the effective merchandising of sugar and its products; to undertake studies to the formulate policies.

Sugar industry and the Philippine economy

Annual production of sugar contributes about 69.7 billion pesos to the national GDP with Value Added Tax (VAT) on the sale of refined sugar reaching over 1.92 billion pesos yearly. Sugar is primarily produced in Western Visayas, as well as in Central Luzon, and some parts of Mindanao. As of Crop Year 2007-08, the province of Negros Occidental accounted for 54% of sugar produced and accounted for 18 billion pesos of Negros' GDP.

It is estimated that as of 2012, the industry provides direct employment to 700,000 sugarcane workers spread across 19 sugar producing provinces.

In 1998 alone, investments to sugar industry have amounted to 20 billion pesos, according to the Board of Investments. These investments are private sector secured, sourced and funded, without cost or security from government.

Sugar industry has a social component, benefiting sugarcane workers. Through the Social Amelioration Fund (SAF), a lien is imposed on the volume of sugar produced. This fund is shouldered by sugar planters and millers and collected by the Bureau of Rural Workers. The benefits for the sugarcane workers under the lien include cash bonus, death benefit, maternity benefit, educational grant and livelihood projects.

The sugar industry funds its own research, development and extension programs through the Philippine Sugar Research Institute Foundation, Inc. (PHILSURIN) with aim to develop high yielding cane varieties. The Philippine government, through SRA, provides the extension efforts in partnerships with the Mill District Development Councils (MDDC). PHILSURIN assists this initiative through the hiring of Mill District Coordinators and financial support to many programs of the MDDC.

The sugar industry is in alternative energy sources which include biofuel through bioethanol production and co-generation activities.

Sub-sectors
The sugar industry has two major sub-sectors: the farming sub-sector and the milling sub-sector.

Farming sub-sector

There are at least 11 regions/19 provinces that produce sugarcane in the nation. A range from 360,000 to 390,000 hectares are devoted to sugarcane production. The largest sugarcane areas are found in the Negros Island Region, which accounts for 51% of sugarcane areas planted. This is followed by Mindanao which accounts for 20%; Luzon by 17%; Panay by 07%; and Eastern Visayas by 04%. It is estimated that as of 2012, the industry provides direct employment to 700,000 sugarcane workers spread across 19 sugar-producing provinces.

Milling sub-sector

As of Crop Year 2012-2013, 29 mills are operational divided as follows: 13 mills in Negros, 6 mills in Luzon, 4 mills in Panay, 3 mills in Eastern Visayas and 3 mills in Mindanao.

Negros (13 mills)
 Aidsisa
 URC Ursumco (Bais)
 CAB -Bais
 Biscom
 Dacongcogon
 First Farmers
 Hawaiian-Philippines
 La Carlota
 Lopez
 Ragasa F.C.
 Sagay
 URC Sonedco (Kabankalan)
 URC Tolong (Caranoche)
 Victorias

Luzon (6 mills)
 URC Carsumco (Piat, Cagayan)
 Sweet Crystals Integrated Sugar Mills (Pampanga)
 Central Azucarera de Tarlac (Tarlac)
 Balayan Sugar Central Incorporated (Balayan, Batangas)
 Central Azucarera Don Pedro (Nasugbu, Batangas)
 Peñafrancia Sugar Mill (Peñafrancia, Camarines Sur)

Panay (4 mills)
 URC Passi (Iloilo)
 Santos Lopez
 Monomer
 Capiz Sugar Central, Inc. (President Roxas, Capiz)

Eastern Visayas (3 mills)
 Bogo-Medellin
 Durano
 Kananga Sugar Mill (Ormoc, Leyte)

Mindanao (4 mills)
 Bukidnon Sugar Company
 Crystal (Maramag, Bukidnon)
 Davao Sugar Central Company (Hagonoy, Davao del Sur)
 Cotabato Sugar Central Company (Matalam, North Cotabato)

See also
 Agriculture in the Philippines
 Land reform in the Philippines
 Sugar Alliance of the Philippines

References

External links

 Sugar Regulatory Administration

Agriculture in the Philippines
 
Philippines